Luka Robert Gavran (born May 5, 2000) is a Canadian professional soccer player who plays as an goalkeeper for Toronto FC II in MLS Next Pro.

Early life
Born in Hamilton, Ontario, Gavran started playing youth soccer at age six with Hamilton Croatia SC, initially playing as a striker, switching to goalkeeper when he was 13. Afterwards, he joined GPS Academy. With GPS he won a Vase Cup title in Northern Ireland in 2017 and was the Ontario Academy Soccer League Goalie of the Year. He also spent some time in the Dinamo Zagreb youth development system.

College career
In 2018, he received a scholarship to St. John's University to play for the men's soccer team. He redshirted his first year in 2018. He made his debut on August 30, 2019 against the Appalachian State Mountaineers. After splitting time in net during his first two seasons, he became the full-time starter during his junior year in 2021, leading the country in shutouts and save percentage. In September 2021, he earned back-to-back Big East Goalkeeper of the Week honours. In 2021, he was named Big East Goalkeeper of the Year, a College Soccer News Second Team All-American, and a United Soccer Coaches Third-team All-American.

Club career
In 2021, he was on the roster for Manhattan SC in USL League Two, but did not appear in any matches.

In 2022, he was selected in the 2nd round (31st overall) in the 2022 MLS SuperDraft by Toronto FC. After attending pre-season with Toronto FC, in March 2022, he signed a professional contract with the second team, Toronto FC II, in MLS Next Pro. He made his debut on April 3 against FC Cincinnati 2. He was named MLS Next Pro Goalkeeper of the Month for July 2022. In August 2022, he was named as a competitor for the MLS All-Stars Skills Challenge ahead of the 2022 MLS All-Star Game.

References

External links

2000 births
Living people
Canadian people of Croatian descent
Canadian soccer players
Soccer players from Hamilton, Ontario
Association football goalkeepers
St. John's Red Storm men's soccer players
Toronto FC draft picks
Toronto FC II players
MLS Next Pro players